Shahidul Islam Master (1950-2016) was a Bangladesh Nationalist Party politician and the former Member of Parliament from Jhenaidah-3.

Career
Master was elected to parliament from Jhenaidah-3 in 1991, 1996, 1996, and 2001. He was the president of Jhenaidah District unit of Bangladesh Nationalist Party. In 2008, Bangladesh Nationalist Party activists campaigned against him getting the nomination and accused him of corruption. He was facing 5 extortion cases and two misappropriation of relief goods in court.

Death
Master died on 21 April 2016.

References

Bangladesh Nationalist Party politicians
2016 deaths
5th Jatiya Sangsad members
6th Jatiya Sangsad members
7th Jatiya Sangsad members
8th Jatiya Sangsad members
People from Jhenaidah District
1950 births